Wiebe may refer to:

 Wiebe (given name), a masculine given name
 Wiebe (surname), a surname